Hamilton East is an inner suburb of Newcastle, New South Wales, Australia, located  west of Newcastle's central business district.

Population
In the 2016 Census, there were 983 people in Hamilton East. 85.3% of people were born in Australia and 85.8% of people spoke only English at home. The most common responses for religion were No Religion 36.0%, Catholic 26.2% and Anglican 13.9%.

References

Suburbs of Newcastle, New South Wales